Melikset Khachiyan (born 6 July 1970 in Baku) is an Armenian-American Grandmaster of chess who now resides in Los Angeles. 

Khachiyan began playing chess at the age of eight. Two years later he won the Baku Junior Championship.  When he was twelve he became a Soviet candidate master. Among his own early coaches was the  9th World Champion, Tigran Petrosian. Also, such great coaches as Aleksander S Nikitin and Alexander Shakarov, who are most known for their coaching and analytical work with the 13th World Champion Garry Kasparov. He earned the title of grandmaster in 2006 after immigrating to the USA.

He competed at the Chess Olympiad of 1996, at the World Team Chess Championship of 1997, where the Armenia national chess team won bronze, their first World Team Championship medal, and at the European Chess Club Cup of 1997.

He was the first coach of Levon Aronian. Currently, he is the coach of Samuel Sevian and of the American women national chess team.

References

External links 
 
 
 
 
 Grandmaster Games Database - Melikset Khachiyan at redhotpawn.com

1970 births
Living people
Chess players from Baku
Chess grandmasters
American chess players
Armenian chess players
Armenian emigrants to the United States